Nehemiah Rice Knight (December 31, 1780April 18, 1854) was Governor of Rhode Island and  United States Senator from Rhode Island. 

Born in Cranston, he attended the common schools. In 1802 he was a member of the Rhode Island House of Representatives; he moved to Providence and was clerk of the Court of Common Pleas from 1805 to 1811 and clerk of the circuit court from 1812 to 1817. He was also collector of customs for the same period. He was the ninth Governor of Rhode Island from 1817 to 1821 and president of the Roger Williams Bank from 1817 to 1854.

Knight was elected in 1821 as a Democratic-Republican to the U.S. Senate to fill the vacancy caused by the death of James Burrill, Jr.; he was reelected in 1823 as a Crawford Republican, in 1829 as an Anti-Jacksonian, and again in 1835 as a Whig, and served from January 9, 1821, to March 3, 1841. While in the Senate he was chairman of the Committee to Audit and Control the Contingent Expenses (Twenty-second, Twenty-third and Twenty-sixth Congresses) and a member of the Committee on Manufactures (Twenty-fourth Congress). Knight retired from public life and was a delegate to the State constitutional convention in 1843. He died in Providence in 1854; interment was in Grace Church Cemetery.

Nehemiah Rice Knight's father, Nehemiah Knight, had been a U.S. Representative from Rhode Island.

References

External links

1780 births
1854 deaths
Politicians from Cranston, Rhode Island
American people of English descent
Democratic-Republican Party United States senators from Rhode Island
National Republican Party United States senators from Rhode Island
Whig Party United States senators from Rhode Island
Rhode Island Democratic-Republicans
Rhode Island National Republicans
Rhode Island Whigs
Governors of Rhode Island
Democratic-Republican Party state governors of the United States
Members of the Rhode Island House of Representatives
Burials in Rhode Island